Li Qishi (born 16 August 1993) is a Chinese speed skater.

Li competed for China at the 2014 Winter Olympics. In the 1500 metres she placed 27th.

Li made her World Cup debut in November 2013. On 23 November 2014, she took her first World Cup victory, in the 1000 m race at the World Cup stop in Seoul, South Korea.
As of February 2016, Li has a total of 5 individual podium placings in the World Cup, all of them in the 1000 m event. Her best classification placement came in the 2014-15 season with 3rd place in the 1000 m overall standing in the World Cup.

References

External links

1993 births
Living people
Chinese female speed skaters
Speed skaters at the 2014 Winter Olympics
Speed skaters at the 2022 Winter Olympics
Olympic speed skaters of China
Speed skaters at the 2017 Asian Winter Games
Asian Games competitors for China
Sportspeople from Jilin City
20th-century Chinese women
21st-century Chinese women
World Single Distances Speed Skating Championships medalists